Ilse Falk is a German politician of the Christian Democratic Union (CDU) and former member of the German Bundestag.

Life 
She was a member of the German Bundestag from 1990 to 2009, joined the CDU in 1984 and has been chairwoman of the Wesel district association of the Women's Union since 1989. From 2001 to 2009 she was also a member of the CDU federal executive committee. From 1990 to 2009 she was a member of the German Bundestag. From 2001 to 2005 she was Parliamentary Secretary of the CDU/CSU parliamentary group and from 2005 to 2009 Deputy Chairperson of the CDU/CSU parliamentary group for the areas of family, senior citizens, women and youth; labour and social affairs; churches; employees.

References 

1943 births
Living people
Members of the Bundestag for Lower Saxony
Members of the Bundestag 2005–2009
Members of the Bundestag 2002–2005
Members of the Bundestag 1998–2002
Members of the Bundestag 1994–1998
Members of the Bundestag 1990–1994
Female members of the Bundestag
20th-century German women politicians
21st-century German women politicians
Members of the Bundestag for the Christian Democratic Union of Germany